Shoal Bay may refer to:

Places

Australia

Northern Territory
 Shoal Bay (Darwin), a bay 
 Shoal Bay, Northern Territory, a locality
 Shoal Bay Coastal Reserve, a protected area
 Shoal Bay Receiving Station, a defence facility
 Shoal Bay Waste Management Facility, a facility in the locality of Holmes, Northern Territory

Elsewhere
 Shoal Bay, New South Wales
 Shoal Bay (Princess Royal Harbour), Western Australia

Canada
 Shoal Bay, British Columbia
 Shoal Bay (Newfoundland and Labrador), Canada
 Shoal Bay, Newfoundland and Labrador, Canada
 Shoal Bay (Freshwater Bay), Newfoundland and Labrador, Canada

See also
 Shoalwater Bay